HMS Venom has been the name of more than one ship of the British Royal Navy, and may refer to:

 , a vessel captured from the French in 1794 and in service until at least 1799 as a gun-brig
 HMS Venom, the original name of the destroyer , renamed while under construction, launched in 1919, and sold for scrapping in 1947
 HMS Venom (P27), a V-class submarine whose construction was cancelled in 1944

Royal Navy ship names